Donal MacIntyre: Unsolved is a British crime reality series in which investigative journalist and self-proclaimed criminologist Donal MacIntyre investigates a number of well noted "cold cases", for which the police have never been able to reach a conclusion. Working alongside a self-assembled cold case team, MacIntyre revisits each case by re-interviewing witnesses, investigating officers and reviewing physical evidence in the hope that "fresh eyes" can release new information and possible theories, which could lead to closure for the family and friends of each of the victims. The series began broadcasting on CBS Reality on 11 October 2015. A total of ten episodes have been broadcast to date.

Cold case team
The cold case team featured in the series is made up of three well known and documented cold-case investigators with experience of similar cases to those featured.
 Donal MacIntyre – a self-proclaimed criminologist and investigative journalist, known for his undercover work with the Daily Mail
 Nicola Tallant – former chief crime reporter for the Sunday World who covered many of the investigations featured during her time with the paper (episodes 1–5)
 Dr. Elizabeth Yardley – professor of sociology and criminology at the University of Birmingham (episodes 6–10)
 Clive Driscoll – a retired DCI from the Metropolitan Police with over 35 years experience dealing with murders and abductions in the London area

Each episode also features analysis from Professor David Wilson, a criminologist and psychologist with over 20 years experience, most notable for his work and investigation into the murders committed by serial killer Steve Wright.

Episode list

Series 1 (2015)
The first series of ten episodes began broadcasting on 11 October 2015.
 Cases that have been filmed but not yet broadcast include the case of Sophie Du Plantier; the case of John Luper; and the case of Amy Fitzpatrick.

References

External links

2010s British documentary television series
2010s British reality television series
2015 British television series debuts
British detective television series
English-language television shows